Oleksandr Ivanovych Perviy (28 October 1960 – 25 September 1985) was a Ukrainian weightlifter. Between 1980 and 1982 he won a silver medal at the 1980 Summer Olympics and six medals at the world and European championships; he also set four world records: three in the clean and jerk and one in the total.

Perviy was known for his weak health and drinking habits. In early 1983, he had his first heart attack, which forced him to retire from sports and from the Soviet Army. Depression and lack of a job resulted in alcoholism and consequent death from another heart attack at the age of 24.

References

1960 births
1985 deaths
Olympic weightlifters of the Soviet Union
Ukrainian male weightlifters
Weightlifters at the 1980 Summer Olympics
Olympic silver medalists for the Soviet Union
Olympic medalists in weightlifting
Medalists at the 1980 Summer Olympics
European Weightlifting Championships medalists
World Weightlifting Championships medalists
Soviet Army personnel
Sportspeople from Donetsk Oblast